Jérôme Henri Carrein (2 July 1941 – 23 June 1977) was the second-to-last convicted criminal to be executed by guillotine in France.

On 27 October 1975 in Arleux, Northern France, Carrein, father of five children, often of no fixed abode, an alcoholic and a tuberculosis sufferer, met Cathy Petit, an eight-year-old local girl. She was the daughter of the owner of a bar that Carrein frequented. Carrein enticed the girl to follow him into nearby marshlands to search for fish bait, dispatching the girl's brother Éric to report to their mother. Cathy and Carrein walked up to the swamps of Palluel (Pas-de-Calais).  Having arrived there, Carrein attempted to rape the child before strangling and drowning her.

Carrein was arrested the next day and quickly confessed to his crime. He was tried before the Pas-de-Calais criminal court at Saint Omer, found guilty and sentenced to death on 12 July 1976. Christian Ranucci, also sentenced to death for kidnapping and child murder, was guillotined at Marseille's Baumettes prison sixteen days later.

Carrein appealed against his sentence and was retried on 1 February 1977 at the criminal court in Douai. Two weeks before the second trial began, Patrick Henry, another child murderer, had narrowly escaped a death sentence at the criminal court in Troyes thanks to the skill of his lawyer, Robert Badinter, and public outrage in France was particularly strong. Carrein was found guilty again and sentenced to death a second time.

Carrein's mercy petition was turned down in mid-June 1977 by President Valéry Giscard d'Estaing. Carrein was guillotined by Marcel Chevalier at 04:30 on 23 June 1977 in the yard of Douai prison. Only one more convicted criminal, Hamida Djandoubi, would be executed by the guillotine in France.

General references 

Article from La Voix du Nord (in French)

Further reading 
Luc Briand (2018). La Revanche de la Guillotine, l'Affaire Carrein (in French), Paris: Plein Jour, 176  p. .

1941 births
1977 deaths
People executed for murder
People executed by the French Fifth Republic
Executed French people
People executed by France by guillotine
People from Douai
French murderers of children
Executed people from Nord-Pas-de-Calais